Suzana Petričević (born 16 February 1959) is a Serbian actress and singer.

Acting career
Suzana Petričević graduated from the Belgrade Drama Arts Academy on the Department for Actors. She became a member of the National Theatre in Belgrade in 1982.

She received the Award for Best Acting Achievement of the National Theatre in 1999 for her role in play Suze su OK (Tears are OK); The Award at Festival of Monodrama and Pantomimes in Zemun (Belgrade) for the role of Gocili in play Poslednja Šansa (The Last Chance); The Award of Festival of Monodrama in Sarajevo (Bosnia and Herzegovina).

Plays

Filmography

Boj na Kosovu (Andja)
13.jul (Verica)
Da cappo (Marja)
Protestni album (Goca)
Prepolovljeni (Branka)
S. O. S. - Spasite naše duše (Nives)
Absurdistan (Eleni)
Selo gori, a baba se češlja (Cveta)

Music career
She graduated from the music school Kosta Manojlović in Belgrade. She had her singing debut in the song "Papaline" released on Momčilo Bajagić's album Pozitivna geografija. In 1986, she formed the pop rock duo Bel Tempo with her brother Vladimir Petričević. Their debut self-titled album was published by PGP-RTB on December 10, 1987. Their second album, Modesty was released on the April 15, 1992, released by PGP-RTB. After Modesty was released they ended their activity, making only a brief comeback with the song "Ljubomora" on the 1996 MESAM festival.

Discography

With Bel Tempo

Studio albums
Bel Tempo (1987)
Modesty (1992)

Singles
"Ljubomora" (1996)

Personal life
Petričević lives in Belgrade with her daughter Dorotea.

References 

Website of National Theatre in Belgrade
BalkanUK
EX YU ROCK enciklopedija 1960-2006, Janjatović Petar; 

1959 births
Living people
People from Šibenik
Serbs of Croatia
Serbian actresses
20th-century Serbian women singers
Serbian pop singers
Serbian rock singers
Yugoslav rock singers
Beovizija contestants